Neslihan Muratdağı (born October 19, 1988), is a Turkish FIFA listed football referee. She is a teacher of physical education by profession.

She was born in Çorlu, Tekirdağ on October 18, 1988.

Referee career

Domestic matches

She has been serving as a football referee since 2009 in the Turkish football league system's Tekirdağ region. She officiates women's football matches in the Third, Second and First leagues, as well as men's matches in the Regional Amateur, TFF Third League and U21 leagues.

International matches

In 2014, she was nominated a FIFA-listed referee. She was appointed referee at the 2015 UEFA Women's Under-17 Special Preparation Tournament, UEFA Women's Under-17 Championship qualification matches of  2017 Group 11, 2018 Group 9 and 2019 Group 8. She was named referee at the 2019 World High School Football Championship held in Belgrade, Serbia. Muratdağı officiated the international friendly matches of women's teams Jordan vs Japan at Amman in November 2017, Jordan vs Taiwan at Amman in March 2018, and Turkey vs Estonia at Istanbul in April 2018. At the 2018–19 UEFA Women's Champions League knockout phase match of Brøndby vs 	LSK Kvinner, she served as the fourth official.

References

1988 births
People from Çorlu
Turkish schoolteachers
Turkish football referees
Turkish sportswomen
Living people
Women association football referees
Turkish women referees and umpires